Black Jack, also known as John Hilliard House, is a historic plantation house located near Red Oak, Nash County, North Carolina.  It was built about 1800, and is a two-story, three bay by two bay, Late Georgian / Federal style frame dwelling with one-story rear additions. It was listed on the National Register of Historic Places in 1974.

The residence was sheathed in weatherboard and has a gable roof. It features double-shoulder, brick exterior end chimneys.

References

Plantation houses in North Carolina
Houses on the National Register of Historic Places in North Carolina
Georgian architecture in North Carolina
Federal architecture in North Carolina
Houses completed in 1800
Houses in Nash County, North Carolina
National Register of Historic Places in Nash County, North Carolina